Trevenning is a hamlet south of Michaelstow, Cornwall, England, UK.

There are three Cornish crosses and a cross base here. In 1896 they were in Mr. Bastard's garden. Mr. Bastard had brought two of the crosses from part of Bodmin Moor in the parish of St Breward in 1888.

Trevenning Cross is at a road junction about one and a half miles northeast of St Tudy churchtown. It was found in the hedge some years before 1896 close to its present position by J. R. Collins of Bodmin.

References

Hamlets in Cornwall